Mir Gol-e Kalati (also Romanized as Mīr Gol-e Kalātī) is a village in Qorqori Rural District, Qorqori District, Hirmand County, Sistan and Baluchestan Province, Iran. At the 2006 census, its population was 48 with 9 families.

References 

Populated places in Hirmand County